Peter Weibel (Austrian German: [ˈvaɪbl], 5 March 1944 – 1 March 2023) was an Austrian post-conceptual artist, curator, and new media theoretician. He started out in 1964 as a visual poet, then later moved from the page to the screen within the sense of post-structuralist methodology. His work includes virtual reality and other digital art forms. From 1999 he was the director of the ZKM Center for Art and Media Karlsruhe.

Biography
Weibel was born in Odessa, USSR on 5 March 1944. He was raised in Ried, Upper Austria, and studied French and cinematography in Paris. In 1964 he began to study medicine in Vienna, but changed soon to mathematics, with an emphasis on logic.

Weibel's work was in conceptual art, performance, experimental film, video art, and computer art.

Beginning in 1965 from semiotic and linguistic reflections (Austin, Jakobson, Peirce, Wittgenstein), Weibel developed an artistic language, which led him from experimental literature to performance. In his performative actions, he explored not only the "media" language and body, but also film, video, television, audiotape and interactive electronic environments. Critically he analyzed their function for the construction of reality. Besides taking part in happenings with members of the Vienna Actionism, he developed from 1967 (together with Valie Export, Ernst Schmidt Jr. and Hans Scheugl) an "expanded cinema" inspired by the American one and reflects the ideological and technological conditions of cinematic representation. Weibel elaborated on these reflections, from 1969, in his video tapes and installations. With his television action "tv und vt works", which was broadcast by the Austrian Television (ORF) in 1972, he transcended the borders of the gallery space and queried video technology in its application as a mass medium. In 1966 he was with Gustav Metzger, Otto Muehl, Wolf Vostell, Hermann Nitsch and others a participant of the Destruction in Art Symposium (DIAS) in London.

Weibel worked using a variety of materials, forms and techniques: text, sculpture, installation, film and video. In 1978 he turned to music. Together with Loys Egg, he founded the band "Hotel Morphila Orchester" (orchestra). In the mid-1980s, he explored the possibilities of computer-aided video processing. Beginning of the 1990s he realized interactive computer-based installations. 

In his lectures and articles, Weibel commented on contemporary art, media history, media theory, film, video art and philosophy. As theoretician and curator, he pleaded for a form of art and art history that includes history of technology and history of science. In his function as a university professor and director of institutions like the Ars Electronica (in Linz, Austria), the Institute for New Media in Frankfurt and the ZKM | Center for Art and Media Karlsruhe, he influenced the European Scene of the so-called computer art through conferences, exhibitions and publications.

In early May 2022, during the 2022 Russian invasion of Ukraine, Weibel advocated for parts of Ukraine, then under de facto Russian control, and Transnistria to be internationally recognized to allow Ukraine to reach some sort of agreement with the Russian Federation.

Weibel died in Karlsruhe, Germany on 1 March 2023, at the age of 78.

Research and teaching

From 1976, Weibel taught at various institutions, including the Universität für Angewandte Kunst in Vienna, in 1981 at the Nova Scotia College of Art and Design in Halifax, Nova Scotia, Canada, and, from 1982-85 at the Gesamthochschule Kassel. In 1984 he was appointed to teach for five years as Associate Professor for Video and Digital Arts at the Center for Media Study at the State University of New York in Buffalo, New York. The same year, 1984 he became Professor for visual media at the Universität für Angewandte Kunst in Vienna. In 1989 he was assigned to set up the Institute for New Media at the Städelschule in Frankfurt, which he headed until 1994. From 1993 to 1999 he curated the Austrian pavilion at the Venice Biennale, after which took on curatorship and directorship at KMZ Arts and Media Centre in Karlsruhe, Germany.

Curatorial activities 

From 1986 Weibel worked as artistic advisor for the Ars Electronica, which he then headed from 1992 until 1995 as its artistic director. From 1993 to 1999, he curated the pavilion of Austria on the Venice Biennial. In the same period, from 1993 to 1999, he worked as chief curator at the Neue Galerie am Landesmuseum Joanneum in Graz, Austria. Since January 1999 Peter Weibel has been Chairman and CEO of the ZKM Center for Art and Media in Karlsruhe, Germany.

 2021: Chiharu Shiota. Connected to Life (with Richard Castelli), ZKM I Center for Art and Media, Karlsruhe
 2020: Critical Zones. Horizonte einer neuen Erdpolitik (with Bruno Latour), ZKM | Center for Art and Media, Karlsruhe
 2019: Writing the History of the Future (with Margit Rosen), Zentrum für Kunst und Medien, Karlsruhe
 2019: Seasons of Media Arts. Stadt der partizipativen Visionen (with Lívia Nolasco-Rózsás, Blanca Giménez, Olga Timurgalieva), ZKM | Center for Art and Media, Karlsruhe
 2019: Schlosslichtspiele, ZKM | Center for Art and Media, Karlsruhe
 2019: Open Codes. Leben in digitalen Welten (mit Blanca Giménez), Bundesministerium der Justiz und für Verbraucherschutz, Berlin
 2019: Negativer Raum. Skulptur und Installation im 20./21. Jahrhundert (with Anett Holzheid, Daria Mille), ZKM | Center for Art and Media, Karlsruhe
 2018: Schlosslichtspiele, ZKM | Center for Art and Media, Karlsruhe
 2018: Kunst in Bewegung. 100 Meisterwerke mit und durch Medien. Ein operationaler Kanon (with Siegfried Zielinski, Judith Bihr, Daria Mille), ZKM | Center for Art and Media, Karlsruhe
 2018: generator marx: kapital | digital, ""generator. medienkunstlabor trier
 2018: DIA-LOGOS. Ramon Llull und die Kunst des Kombinierens (with Amador Vega, Siegfried Zielinski, Bettina Korintenberg), ZKM | Center for Art and Media, Karlsruhe
 2017/2018: The Art of Immersion (with Richard Castelli and Dennis Del Favero), ZKM | Center for Art and Media, Karlsruhe
 2017: Schlosslichtspiele, ZKM | Center for Art and Media, Karlsruhe
 2017: Markus Lüpertz. Kunst, die im Wege steht (with Walter Smerling), ZKM | Center for Art and Media, Karlsruhe
 2017: Kunst in Europa 1945-1968. Die Zukunft im Blick. Art in Europe 1945-1968, Staatliches Museum für Bildende Künste A. S. Puschkin, Moskau
 2017: Bodenlos - Vilém Flusser und die Künste (with Baruch Gottlieb, Pavel Vančát, Siegfried Zielinski), GAMU (Galerie AMU), Prag
 2016: William Kentridge: More Sweetly Play the Dance, ZKM | Center for Art and Media, Karlsruhe
 2016: Schlosslichtspiele, ZKM | Center for Art and Media, Karlsruhe
 2016: Liquid Identities - Lynn Hershman Leeson. Identitäten im 21. Jahrhundert (with Andreas Beitin), Lehmbruck Museum, Duisburg
 2016: Kunst in Europa 1945-1968. Der Kontinent, den die EU nicht kennt (with Eckhart J. Gillen, Daria Mille, Daniel Bulatov), ZKM | Center for Art and Media, Karlsruhe
 2016: Digitale Wasserspiele, ZKM | Center for Art and Media, Karlsruhe
 2016: Bodenlos - Vilém Flusser und die Künste (with Baruch Gottlieb, Siegfried Zielinski), Akademie der Künste, Berlin
 2016: Bodenlos - Vilém Flusser und die Künste (with Baruch Gottlieb, Siegfried Zielinski), West, Den Haag
 2016: Beat Generation (with Jean-Jacques Lebel, Philippe-Alain Michaud), ZKM | Center for Art and Media, Karlsruhe
 2015: Transsolar + Tetsuo Kondo. Cloudscapes, ZKM | Center for Art and Media, Karlsruhe
 2015: Schlosslichtspiele, ZKM | Center for Art and Media, Karlsruhe
 2015: Ryoji Ikeda. micro | macro, ZKM | Center for Art and Media, Karlsruhe
 2015: Lichtsicht, Projektions-Biennale, Bad Rothenfelde
 2015: Infosphäre (with Daria Mille, Giulia Bini), ZKM | Center for Art and Media, Karlsruhe
 2015: HA Schult: Action Blue (with Bernhard Serexhe), ZKM | Center for Art and Media, Karlsruhe
 2015: Exo-Evolution (with Sabiha Keyif, Philipp Ziegler, Giulia Bini), ZKM | Center for Art and Media, Karlsruhe
 2015: Die Stadt ist der Star - Kunst an der Baustelle. Vom K-Punkt am Staatstheater bis zum Marktplatz (with Andreas Beitin), ZKM | Center for Art and Media, Karlsruhe
 2015: Lynn Hershman Leeson. Civic Radar (with Andreas Beitin), Deichtorhallen Hamburg in der Sammlung Falckenberg, Hamburg
 2015: Bodenlos - Vilém Flusser und die Künste (with Baruch Gottlieb, Siegfried Zielinski), ZKM | Center for Art and Media, Karlsruhe
 2014: Lynn Hershman Leeson. Civic Radar (with Andreas Beitin), ZKM | Center for Art and Media, Karlsruhe
 2011: The Global Contemporary Kunstwelten nach 1989 (with Andrea Buddensieg), ZKM Center for Art and Media, Karlsruhe
 2011: Moderne: Selbstmord der Kunst? Im Spiegel der Sammlung der Neuen Galerie Graz (with Christa Steinle and Gudrun Danzer), Neue Galerie Graz
 2011: Bruseum. Ein Museum für Günter Brus (with Anke Orgel), Neue Galerie Graz
 2011: Hans Hollein (with Günther Holler-Schuster), Neue Galerie Graz
 2011: Francesco Lo Savio – Tano Festa. The Lack of the Other (with Freddy Paul Grunert), ZKM Center for Art and Media
 2008: youniverse, International Biennal of Contemporary Arts, Sevilla
 2005: Lichtkunst aus Kunstlicht (with Gregor Jansen), ZKM | Center for Art and Media, Karlsruhe
 2005: Making Things Public (with Bruno Latour), ZKM | Center for Art and Media, Karlsruhe
 2003: M_ARS: Kunst und Krieg (with Günther Holler-Schuster), Neue Galerie Graz
 2002: Future Cinema (with Jeffrey Shaw), ZKM | Center for Art and Media, Karlsruhe
 2002: Iconoclash (with Bruno Latour), ZKM | Center for Art and Media, Karlsruhe
 2000/2001: Olafur Eliasson: Surroundings surroanded, Neue Galerie Graz and ZKM | Center for Art and Media, Karlsruhe
 2000: Net_condition (with Walter van der Crijusen, Johannes Goebel, Golo Foellmer, Hans-Peter Schwarz, Jeffrey Shaw, Benjamin Weill) ZKM | Center for Art and Media, Karlsruhe
 1999/2000: Der anagrammatische Körper Kunsthaus Muerz, Muerzzuschlag | Neue Galerie, Graz and ZKM | Center for Art and Media, Karlsruhe
 1999: Open Practice, 48th Biennale de Venise
 1998: Jenseits von Kunst, MUHKA, Museum van Hedendaagse Kunst, Antwerpen; Neue Galerie, Graz; Ludwig-Museum, Budapest
 1996: Inklusion: Exklusion, Steirischen Herbst 96, Graz
 1993: Kontext Kunst, Neue Galerie Graz
 1991: Das Bild nach dem letzten Bild (with Kaspar König), Galerie Metropol, Vienna
 1990: Vom Verschwinden der Ferne (with Edith Decker), Postmuseum, Frankfurt am Main
 1987: Logokultur, Universitaet fuer angewandte Kunst, Vienna
 1976: Österreichs Avantgarde 1908-38 (with Oswald Oberhuber), Galerie naechst St. Stephan, Vienna

Decorations and awards
 2002: Grand Decoration of Honour for Services to the Republic of Austria
 2009: Austrian Cross of Honour for Science and Art, 1st class
 2013: Honorary doctorate from University of Pécs, Hungary
 2020: Lovis Corinth prize

Bibliography
 
 
 
 
 
 
 
 
 
 
 
 
 "Peter Weibel": Sarah Cook, Verina Gfader, Beryl Graham & Axel Lapp, A Brief History of Curating New Media Art: Conversations with Curators, Berlin: The Green Box, 2010: pp. 27–37. .
 Car Culture—Medien der Mobilität. (Ed.): Peter Weibel, Zentrum für Kunst und Medientechnologie, Karlsruhe 2011, .
 
 Beuys Brock Vostell. Aktion Demonstration Partizipation 1949–1983. (Ed.): Peter Weibel, ZKM - Zentrum für Kunst und Medientechnologie, Hatje Cantz, Karlsruhe, 2014, .
 Der Wiener Kreis – Aktualität in Wissenschaft, Literatur, Architektur und Kunst. (Eds.): Ulrich Arnswald, Friedrich Stadler, and Peter Weibel, LIT Verlag, Wien, 2019, .
 Weibel, Peter (2022). Negative Space: Trajectories of Sculpture in the 20th and 21st Centuries. Cambridge: MIT Press. .

Notes

External links
 Website of Peter Weibel
 CV, including his exhibitions
 Bibliography
 Thomas Dreher: Valie Export/Peter Weibel. Multimedial feminist art
 Thomas Dreher: Peter Weibel - Polycontexturality in reactive installations/Polykontexturalität in reaktiver Medienkunst in German
 WhenWhereWh.at Interview with Peter Weibel on Vienna Biennale Exhibitions 2015 in English
 
 

1944 births
2023 deaths
Artists from Odesa
Ukrainian emigrants to Austria
University at Buffalo alumni
Austrian video artists
Austrian digital artists
Austrian film directors
German-language film directors
Academic staff of NSCAD University
Recipients of the Grand Decoration for Services to the Republic of Austria
Officiers of the Ordre des Arts et des Lettres
Recipients of the Order of Merit of Baden-Württemberg
Recipients of the Austrian Cross of Honour for Science and Art, 1st class
Austrian experimental filmmakers
Austrian contemporary artists
Ukrainian experimental filmmakers
Academic staff of the University of Applied Arts Vienna
Post-conceptual artists